1164 Kobolda, provisional designation , is a stony Phocaea asteroid from the inner regions of the asteroid belt, approximately 7 kilometers in diameter. Discovered by Karl Reinmuth at Heidelberg Observatory in 1930, the asteroid was later named after German astronomer Hermann Kobold.

Discovery 

Kobolda was discovered on 19 March 1930, by German astronomer Karl Reinmuth at the Heidelberg-Königstuhl State Observatory in southwest Germany. On the following night, it was independently discovered by Walter Baade at the Bergedorf Observatory in Hamburg. The Minor Planet Center, however, only acknowledges the first discoverer.

Orbit and classification 

Kobolda is a member of the Phocaea family, which is a stony family of nearly 2,000 known members, named after the family's parent body 25 Phocaea.

This asteroid orbits the Sun in the inner main-belt at a distance of 1.9–2.8 AU once every 3 years and 6 months (1,279 days). Its orbit has an eccentricity of 0.20 and an inclination of 25° with respect to the ecliptic. The body's observation arc begins with its official discovery observation at Heidelberg in 1930.

Physical characteristics 

Kobolda is an assumed stony S-type asteroid, which concurs with the overall spectral type of the Phocaea family.

Rotation period 

Several rotational lightcurves of Kobolda have been obtained from photometric observations since 2007. Lightcurve analysis gave a well-defined rotation period between 4.141 and 4.154 hours with a brightness amplitude of 0.21 to 0.30 magnitude.

Diameter and albedo 

According to the surveys carried out by the Japanese Akari satellite and the NEOWISE mission of NASA's Wide-field Infrared Survey Explorer, Kobolda measures between 5.79 and 8.751 kilometers in diameter  and its surface has an albedo between 0.1754 and 0.405.

The Collaborative Asteroid Lightcurve Link assumes an albedo of 0.23 (derived from 25 Phocaea) and calculates a diameter of 7.63 kilometers based on an absolute magnitude of 12.8.

Naming 

The official naming citation was mentioned in The Names of the Minor Planets by Paul Herget in 1955.

Trivia

Pluto's number 

Were Pluto categorized as a minor planet when discovered in early 1930, shortly before , the number  could have been assigned to Pluto. However, these assumptions are only speculative as there is generally only a slight correlation between the discovery date of a minor planet and its final number. However the proposal met "stiff resistance" and the number was assigned to 10000 Myriostos instead. Eventually, Pluto was given the number .

Notes

References

External links 
 Asteroid Lightcurve Database (LCDB), query form (info )
 Dictionary of Minor Planet Names, Google books
 Asteroids and comets rotation curves, CdR – Observatoire de Genève, Raoul Behrend
 Discovery Circumstances: Numbered Minor Planets (1)-(5000) – Minor Planet Center
 
 

001164
Discoveries by Karl Wilhelm Reinmuth
Named minor planets
19300319